In Search of the Second Amendment is a documentary film on the Second Amendment of the United States Constitution. It was produced and directed by American author and attorney David T. Hardy. He argues the individual rights model of the Second Amendment. Hardy also discusses the Fourteenth Amendment.

Outline of the documentary
 How Did You Become Interested in the Second Amendment?
 Legal Scholarship and the Second Amendment

 England and the Militia
 Duty to be Armed

 1688 A Medieval Duty Becomes an "Antient and Indubitable Right"
 King Charles I, Oliver Cromwell, and Richard Cromwell
 King Charles II, King James II, and Gun Control
 The Glorious Revolution, King William III, Queen Mary II, and the Bill of Rights 1689

 1603–1768 Rights of Englishmen, Rights of Americans
 The Colonies and the Duty to be Armed
 The Right to Arms and William Blackstone

 1768–1775 The Right Is Challenged as Revolution Approaches
 Britain takes notice and the Redcoats Come to Boston
 Conflict Breaks Out

 1776–1780 The First State Constitutions Give Different Models for a Right to Arms
 Virginia Declaration of Rights
 Pennsylvania Declaration of Rights
 Massachusetts Declaration of Rights

 1787–1789 A Proposal for a New Constitution Leads to Calls for a National Right to Arms
 The Constitutional Convention and the Bill of Rights
 State Ratification and Declaration of Rights Proposals
 Virginia and the Demand for a Bill of Rights
 The Compromise and James Madison
 Drafting of the Right to Arms
 The Militia and Standing Armies

 1789 In the First Congress, James Madison Fulfils the Great Compromise
 Madison and the Bill of Rights
 How the Second Amendment was Drafted
 The Militia, the States, and the Federal Government
 The Senate and the Second Amendment
 Tench Coxe
 St. George Tucker
 William Rawle
 Thomas Cooley
 Contemporaries and the Second Amendment

 So What's the Debate? Tracing the Origin of the Belief that the 2nd Amendment Relates to a State's Right to have a National Guard
 Meaning of "The People"
 Origin of the Collective Right
 Kansas Supreme Court
 The National Guard
 United States v. Miller (1939)
 United States v. Emerson (2001)

 1868 The 14th Amendment Creates a New Guarantee of the Right to Arms: The Afro–American Experience
 Slave Codes
 Dred Scott v. Sandford (1856)
 Black Codes
 Views and Response of Congress
 Civil Rights Act of 1866 and Freedmen's Bureau Act of 1866
 The Federal Bill of Rights and the States
 The Fourteenth Amendment
 In Re Slaughter–House Cases (1873)
 United States v. Cruikshank (1875)
 D. W. Griffith's The Birth of a Nation

 Civil Rights Movement
 Professor Olson's and Don Kate's Experiences as workers during the Civil Rights Movement
 Deacons for Defense
 Robert Williams and the NRA
 Lumbee Indian Tribe

 American Enterprise Institute (AEI) Symposium on the Right to Arms
 Meaning of "The People" Revisited
 Dred Scott Revisited
 A New View of Standing Armies and Militias
 The Fourteenth Amendment Revisited
 Republican and Democratic Party Platforms on the Right to Arms
 Freedmen's Bureau Act of 1866 Revisited
 18th and 19th Century Interpretation of the Second Amendment

 Governments, Genocides, and Utility of the Right
 Armed Resistance and Genocide
 Protection from Different Sources of Oppression
 Frequency of Defensive Gun Uses and Crimes Committed
 Guns and Number of Lives Saved vs. Lives Taken
 Police and the Legal Duty to Protect the Public
 Warren v. District of Columbia (1981)
 View of Fellow Citizens
 Effectiveness of Defensive Gun Use
 Right of Self-defense and the Right to Arms
 Protecting the Second Amendment and Other Rights

 Final Scene
 Closing Words
 Credits
 Dedications

Persons appearing in the documentary
Professors of law

Professors of criminology

Others

Notes

External links
 Official website 
 Videos about documentary at YouTube
 Trailer (2:10)
 Various previews
 JPFO interview about documentary
 MP3 format (26:41, 12.2 MiB)
 Liberty Watch Radio interview about documentary (MP3 format)
 Part 1 (47:01, 8.07 MiB)
 Part 2 (47:37, 8.17 MiB)
 Gun Talk interview about documentary (MP3 format, 44:40, 10.3 MiB)

2006 films
2006 documentary films
American documentary films
Documentary films about American politics
2000s English-language films
2000s American films